Jimmy Fortune (born March 11, 1955) is an American country music singer from Nelson County, Virginia. Fortune sang tenor for The Statler Brothers for 21 years, and wrote the song "Elizabeth" for the group. After The Statler Brothers retired, he continued to perform as a solo artist.

Biography

Fortune grew up in Nelson County, Virginia, where he attended Nelson County High School in Lovingston, Virginia.

The original tenor of the Statler Brothers, Lew DeWitt, heard Fortune sing at a local ski resort.  When DeWitt was suffering from Crohn's disease and needed a temporary replacement, he asked Fortune to come to audition for the band in Nashville.  Fortune started performing with the Statler Brothers in 1982, originally as a temporary replacement for DeWitt, and joined the group permanently later in the year when DeWitt decided to quit the group due to his illness.

Fortune wrote several number one songs that were recorded by the Statler Brothers, including "Elizabeth", "Too Much on My Heart", and "My Only Love". "More Than a Name on a Wall" was a top ten country hit. "Elizabeth" recently was a top bluegrass release for Dailey & Vincent. He spent 21 years touring, singing, and performing with the Statler Brothers.

In 2002, after the Statlers disbanded, Fortune continued his career as a solo artist with an extensive performance schedule in the U.S. and Canada. He has continued as a songwriter and has recorded a number of projects in Nashville that he mostly produced himself. In 2015 he released Hits & Hymns produced by Ben Isaacs.  The album reached Top Ten on Billboard's Top Country Albums chart, and the DVD release of a TV special, "Jimmy Fortune: Hits & Hymns," hosted by Bill Gaither, debuted at No. 1 on the Billboard Music Video chart.

Discography

Albums

Singles

Guest singles

Music videos

References

External links
 Official Website

American country singer-songwriters
American tenors

1955 births
American people of Welsh descent
Country Music Hall of Fame inductees
Country musicians from Virginia
Living people
Members of the Country Music Association
People from Nelson County, Virginia
People from Staunton, Virginia
People from Sumner County, Tennessee
People from Williamsburg, Virginia
Singer-songwriters from Tennessee
Singer-songwriters from Virginia
The Statler Brothers members